Migel Antonio Puente Aguilar (born May 8, 1948 in San Luis Potosí, San Luis Potosí) is a Mexican former professional baseball pitcher. The right-hander was signed by the San Francisco Giants as an amateur free agent before the 1968 season, and he played for the Giants in 1970.

Career
Puente's major league career lasted for about four weeks, starting four games and relieving in two others during the month of May. He did not perform well overall, giving up 36 baserunners (25 hits and 11 walks) and 17 earned runs in just 18.2 innings. He did, however, pitch one great game. On May 8, 1970, he pitched a seven-hit complete game against the World Champion New York Mets, winning 7–1 at Shea Stadium in front of a big crowd of 43,109.

Season and career totals include a 1–3 record, 14 strikeouts, 1 game finished, and an ERA of 8.20.

External links

Retrosheet

1948 births
Living people
Alijadores de Tampico players
Amarillo Giants players
Baseball players from San Luis Potosí
Bravos de Reynosa players
Dorados de Chihuahua players
Fresno Giants players
Indios de Ciudad Juárez (minor league) players
Major League Baseball pitchers
Major League Baseball players from Mexico
Mexican expatriate baseball players in the United States
Mexican League baseball pitchers
People from San Luis Potosí City
Phoenix Giants players
San Francisco Giants players